Raphael Samuel is the Anglican Bishop of Bolivia. He is the first Asian bishop in the Spanish speaking world.

Samuel was born in Singapore on 16 January 1957. He joined the Republic of Singapore Navy in 1974. In 1980 he left to study at Trinity Theological College.  In 1993 he went to Bolivia as a missionary.

References

21st-century Anglican bishops in South America
Living people
Anglican bishops of Bolivia
Singaporean Christian clergy
Year of birth missing (living people)